Benoit Daeninck (born 27 December 1981) is a French road and track cyclist, who most recently competed for French amateur team CC Nogent-sur-Oise. He competed in the team pursuit event at the 2010 and 2011 UCI Track Cycling World Championships.

Major results

1998
 1st  Team pursuit, National Junior Track Championships
2001
 3rd Team pursuit, National Track Championships
2003
 3rd Points race, National Under-23 Track Championships
 4th Chrono Champenois
2005
 3rd Madison, National Track Championships
2007
 National Track Championships
1st  Points race
2nd Individual pursuit
 1st Road race, Champagne-Ardenne Regional Road Championships
 1st Grand Prix de la Ville de Lillers
 Tour de Guadeloupe
1st Prologue & Stage 7
 4th Overall Ronde de l'Oise
1st Stage 3
 10th Boucle de l'Artois
2008
 1st Road race, Picardy Regional Road Championships
 2nd Grand Prix de la Ville de Lillers
2009
 1st Stage 8 Tour de Normandie
 1st Stage 4 Boucles de la Mayenne
 2nd Points race, National Track Championships
 4th Overall Circuit des Ardennes
1st Stage 1
 5th Grand Prix de la ville de Nogent-sur-Oise
2010
 National Track Championships
1st  Madison (with Damien Gaudin)
1st  Team pursuit
3rd Points race
 1st Grand Prix de la Ville de Lillers
 1st Stage 3 Tour de Bretagne
 6th Grand Prix de la ville de Nogent-sur-Oise
 6th Tro-Bro Léon
2011
 National Track Championships
1st  Points race
1st  Team pursuit
 5th Tro-Bro Léon
2012
 1st  Points race, National Track Championships
 1st Ronde Pévéloise
 1st Mountains classification Circuit des Ardennes
 8th Paris–Troyes
2013
 1st Grand Prix de la Ville de Lillers
 1st Ronde Pévéloise
 1st Grand Prix des Marbriers
 2nd Paris–Mantes-en-Yvelines
 National Track Championships
3rd Points race
3rd Team pursuit
 4th Overall Ronde de l'Oise
2014
 National Track Championships
1st  Madison (with Marc Fournier)
2nd Team pursuit
 1st Ronde Pévéloise
 3rd Grand Prix de la Ville de Lillers
 4th Paris–Mantes-en-Yvelines
2015
 6th Paris–Chauny
2016
 1st  Team pursuit, National Track Championships

References

External links
 

1981 births
Living people
People from Provins
French track cyclists
French male cyclists
Sportspeople from Seine-et-Marne
Cyclists from Île-de-France